Nakul Das Rai (born 12 February 1960) was
 a member of the 14th Lok Sabha of India. He represented the Sikkim constituency and is a member of the Sikkim Kranti Kari Morcha (SKM) political party.

External links
 Official biographical sketch in Parliament of India website

1960 births
Living people
Sikkim Democratic Front politicians
India MPs 2004–2009
People from Gangtok district
Lok Sabha members from Sikkim
Indian Gorkhas
Trinamool Congress politicians